LCE may refer to
 Landing Craft, Emergency repairs, a World War II landing craft
 Golosón International Airport, La Ceiba, Honduras (IATA Airport code LCE)
 Leaving Certificate Examination, for school leavers in Ireland
 Life Cycle Engineering, a methodology for assessing environmental impact.
 Lithium Carbonate Equivalent, a term used in the lithium industry for the first commonly traded Lithium intermediate in the value chain
 Load Carrying Equipment, soldier's webbing such as MOLLE and PLCE
 Loews Cineplex Entertainment, a cinema chain in the United States which merged with AMC Theatres
 Logistics Combat Element, responsible for providing logistical support for United States Marine Corps MAGTFs
 London Commodity Exchange, which merged into LIFFE
 Low-carbon economy, an economy which has a minimal output of carbon dioxide emissions into the biosphere
 Lyapunov characteristic exponent, a measure of the rate of separation of infinitesimally close trajectories in a dynamical system.
 Lycée Classique d'Echternach, a school at Echternach, Luxembourg

 Choriolysin L, an enzyme